Minuscule 535 (in the Gregory-Aland numbering), 548 (Scrivener), ε 140 (in Soden's numbering), is a Greek minuscule manuscript of the New Testament, on a parchment, dated to the 12th century. It was adapted for liturgical use, with full marginalia.

The manuscript is very lacunose.

Description 

The codex contains an incomplete text of the Gospel of Matthew, Gospel of Mark on 125 parchment leaves (size ) with some lacunae (Matthew 11:28-13:33; 18:13-21:15; 21:33-22:10; 24:46-25:22; Mark 3:11-5:31). The text is written in one column per page, 18 lines per page.

There is also a division according to the smaller Ammonian Sections (in Mark 233 Sections - the last in 16:8), whose numbers are given at the margin, with references to the Eusebian Canons (written below Ammonian Section numbers).
It contains a lectionary markings at the margin (for liturgical use), incipits, Synaxarion, and Menologion.

Text 

The Greek text of the codex is a representative of the Byzantine text-type. Aland placed it in Category V.

History 

The manuscript is dated by the INTF on the palaeographical ground to the 11th century.

In 1864 the manuscript was purchased from a dealer at Janina in Epeiros, by Baroness Burdett-Coutts (1814-1906), a philanthropist, together with other Greek manuscripts (among them codices 532-546). They were transported to England in 1870–1871. All collection was presented by Burdett-Coutts to Sir Roger Cholmely's School.

It was added to the list of the New Testament manuscripts by F. H. A. Scrivener (548) and C. R. Gregory (535). Gregory saw it in 1883.

Formerly the manuscript was housed at the Highgate (Burdett-Coutts 1. 9), in London.

It was examined and collated by Scrivener.

It is currently housed at the University of Michigan (Ms. 20) in Ann Arbor.

See also 

 List of New Testament minuscules
 Biblical manuscript
 Textual criticism

References

Further reading 

 F. H. A. Scrivewner, Adversaria critica sacra (Cambridge 1893), p. XLI. (as h)
 Kenneth W. Clark, A Descriptive Catalogue of Greek New Testament Manuscripts in America (Chicago, 1937), pp. 288–289.

External links 
 Images of the minuscule 535 at the CSNTM

Greek New Testament minuscules
12th-century biblical manuscripts
University of Michigan